Middle Jiasong Road is a station on Line 17 of the Shanghai Metro. This station opened with the rest of Line 17 on 30 December 2017.

History 
The station opened for passenger trial operation on 30 December 2017, concurrent with the opening of the rest of Line 17.

Description 
The station is located at the intersection of East Yinggang Road and Middle Jiasong Road, in the Qingpu District of Shanghai. An elevated structure, the station consists of two floors, a platform level and concourse level, both located above the roadway of East Yinggang Road. At concourse level are the fare gates, ticket machines, and a customer service counter. The concourse level can be reached via two exits which descend to street level, one on each side of East Yinggang Road. Toilets are available within the fare-paid zone at concourse level. The platform level is located above the concourse level and features two side platforms.

Like all stations on Line 17, the station is fully accessible from all entrances. There are a total of four elevators in the station: two connecting each exit with concourse level, and two connecting the concourse level with each of the side platforms within the fare-paid zone.

Exits 

The station has two exits:
 Exit 1: East Yinggang Road north side, Middle Jiasong Road
 Exit 2: East Yinggang Road south side, Middle Jiasong Road

References 

Railway stations in Shanghai
Shanghai Metro stations in Qingpu District
Railway stations in China opened in 2017
Line 17, Shanghai Metro